Col. Saeed Abdi Farah is a Somali politician. He previously served as Mayor of Galkayo, the capital of the Mudug region in north-central Somalia.

Career
Farah was appointed Mayor of Galkayo on August 24, 2011 by the autonomous Puntland administration.

In 2012, he launched seven new major development projects in the city. The latter include the construction of several schools and businesses in the Garsoor and Israa neighborhoods. Mayor Farah and the Mudug region Governor Mohamed Yusuf Jama (Tigey) also oversaw the opening of a new construction firm in addition to another water filtration company, Duuh.

On February 6, 2013, Ahmed Ali Salaad succeeded Farah as Mayor of Galkayo. During his time leading the municipal authority, Farah is credited with having considerably strengthened local security and promoted various social programs in the city in conjunction with the Mudug regional office. He is reportedly next slated to assume a leadership position with the Puntland Dervish Force (Puntland Daraawiish).

References

Ethnic Somali people
Living people
Mayors of places in Somalia
Year of birth missing (living people)